Sarıkaya is a village in the Sungurlu District of Çorum Province in Turkey. Its population is 134 (2022).

References

Villages in Sungurlu District